The 2000 Proximus 24 Spa World Championship GT was the 54th running of the Spa 24 Hours. It took place at the Circuit de Spa-Francorchamps, Belgium, over August 6, 2000. The event was won by the #1 Peugeot Team Belgique Luxembourg Peugeot 306 GTi.

3 classes ran in the event. Superproduction fuel (SP), Group N (N), and Superproduction diesel (SPD). 82 cars started with 38 being classified.

Official results
Class winners in bold. Cars failing to complete 70% of winner's distance marked as Not Classified (NC).

References

External links
Race results

Spa 24 Hours
Spa 24 Hours